Pukhlyakovsky (masculine), Pukhlyakovskaya (feminine), or Pukhlyakovskoye (neuter) is the name of several rural localities in Rostov Oblast, Russia:
Pukhlyakovsky, Ust-Donetsky District, Rostov Oblast, a khutor in Pukhlyakovskoye Rural Settlement of Ust-Donetsky District
Pukhlyakovsky, Verkhnedonskoy District, Rostov Oblast, a khutor in Kazanskoye Rural Settlement of Verkhnedonskoy District